B. S. Lokanath (c. 1937 – 2011) was an Indian cinematographer who worked in Tamil, Telugu, Kannada and Hindi films. He is well known as the cinematographer of K. Balachander and has worked in 55 films with him. During his career, he won the National Film Award for Best Cinematography for Apoorva Raagangal (1975) and the Tamil Nadu State Film Award for Best Cinematographer for Ninaithale Inikkum (1979). He died of a heart attack in Chennai on 9 December 2011.

Partial filmography

 Uttharavindri Ulle Vaa (1971)
 Dhikku Theriyadha Kaattil (1972)
 Arangetram (1973)
 Sollathaan Ninaikkiren (1973)
 Aaina (1977)
 Aval Oru Thodar Kathai (1974)
 Naan Avanillai (1974)
 Apoorva Raagangal (1975)
 Manmatha Leelai (1976)
 Anthuleni Katha (1976)
 Moondru Mudichu (1976)
 Avargal (1977)
 Chilakamma Cheppindi (1977)
 Maro Charitra (1978)
 Pranam Khareedu (1978)
 Nizhal Nijamagiradhu (1978)
 Thappu Thalangal / Thappida Thala (1978)
 Ninaithale Inikkum / Andamaina Anubhavam (1979)
 Nool Veli/ Guppedu Manasu (1979)
 Idi Katha Kaadu (1979)
 Aakali Rajyam (1981)
 Varumayin Niram Sivappu (1981)
 Ek Duuje Ke Liye (1981)
 Thanneer Thanneer (1981)
 Aadavaallu Meeku Joharlu (1981)
 Enga Ooru Kannagi (1981)
 Thillu Mullu (1981)
 47 Natkal / 47 Rojulu (1981)
 Agni Sakshi (1982)
 Zara Si Zindagi (1983)
 Benkiyalli Aralida Hoovu (1983)
 Poikkal Kudhirai (1983)
 Kokilamma (1983)
 Ek Nai Paheli (1984)
 Achamillai Achamillai (1984)
 Eradu Rekhegalu (1984)
 Haqeeqat (1985)
 Mugila Mallige (1985)
Oorkavalan (1987)
Thangathin Thangam (1990)
 Pudhiya Raagam (1991)
Paarambariyam (1993)
 Ellame En Rasathan (1995)

References

External links

Cinematographers from Tamil Nadu
Best Cinematography National Film Award winners
Tamil Nadu State Film Awards winners
1937 births
2011 deaths
Tamil film cinematographers
Artists from Chennai
20th-century Indian photographers
Kannada film cinematographers
Telugu film cinematographers